Anthony David Parsons OAM (known as Tony Parsons) is an Australian author and kelpie breeder.

He founded the well-known Kelpie stud “Karrawarra” in 1950 and has gone on to become the breed's most passionate and hardest working advocate. Before that, he was a professional sheep and wool classer. Don Burke said that Tony Parsons has done more to developing the Kelpie as a working dog than anyone else. Kelpie breeder Jan Lowing says that "Parsons (Karrawarra) was responsible for seeking out and preserving Kelpie bloodlines after the fiasco of two World Wars, during which many ‘studs’ disappeared".

Parsons spent time in the Mudgee area 300 km north west of Sydney up to 1972, and based several of his fiction books in the region. He subsequently lived at East Greenmount, Queensland near Toowoomba where his Kelpie stud is located.

Bibliography

Novels
 The call of the high country (1991) - Penguin, Ringwood Vic, 
 Return to the high country (2001) - Penguin, Ringwood Vic, 
 Silver in the sun (2007) - Viking, Camberwell Vic., 
 The bird smugglers of Mountain View (2008) 
 Valley of the white gold (2011) - Penguin, Camberwell Vic., 
 Back to the Pilliga (2013) - Allen & Unwin, Sydney,  
 Return to Moondilla (2015) - Arena Books, Crows Nest, NSW,

Non-fiction
 The Working Kelpie (1986) - Nelson, Melbourne, 
 Training the working kelpie (1990) - Viking O'Neil, Ringwood, Vic., 
 The Australian kelpie : the essential guide to the Australian working dog (1992) - Viking O'Neil, Richmond, Vic.,  
 The kelpie (2010) – Penguin Group Australia,

Awards 
In 1992, he was awarded the prestigious Medal of the Order of Australia for his “contribution to the propagation of the Australian Kelpie sheep dog”.

References

External links 
 Tony Parsons - Allen & Unwin 

Living people
20th-century Australian novelists
21st-century Australian novelists
Dog breeders
Australian non-fiction writers
Year of birth missing (living people)